Diabolical Age is the third studio album by Norwegian black metal band Ragnarok, released on January 31, 2000, under Head Not Found record label. It is the final album with vocalist Thyme (Dag Ronny Hansen). Arcturus guitarist Knut Magne Valle was the engineer on the recording sessions.

Track listing 
All music and lyrics by Ragnarok, except lyrics for track 3 by Lillith Demona and music for track 8 written and performed by Jørgen Ø. Andersen.

Personnel

Ragnarok
Thyme: Vocal
Rym: Guitars
Jerv: Bass
Jontho P.: Drums

Additional personnel
Jørgen Ø. Andersen - Keyboards (track 8)

Production and engineering 
Recorded during October 1998 and February 1999 at Endless Studio in Oslo.
Produced by Tore Moren, Knut Magne Valle and Ragnarok.
Mastered at Strype Audio by Tom Kvålsvoll and Ragnarok.

References

External links 
 Allmusic listing
Metallum Archives
Discogs.com

2000 albums
Ragnarok (Norwegian band) albums
Head Not Found albums